The 1986 US Open was a tennis tournament played on outdoor hard courts at the USTA National Tennis Center in New York City in New York in the United States. It was the 106th edition of the US Open and was held from August 26 to September 7, 1986.

Seniors

Men's singles

 Ivan Lendl defeated  Miloslav Mečíř 6–4, 6–2, 6–0
 It was Lendl's 4th career Grand Slam title and his 2nd US Open title.

Women's singles

 Martina Navratilova defeated  Helena Suková 6–3, 6–2
 It was Navratilova's 41st career Grand Slam title and her 9th US Open title.

Men's doubles

 Andrés Gómez /  Slobodan Živojinović defeated  Joakim Nyström /  Mats Wilander 4–6, 6–3, 6–3, 4–6, 6–3
 It was Gómez's 1st career Grand Slam title and his only US Open title. It was Živojinović's only career Grand Slam title.

Women's doubles

 Martina Navratilova /  Pam Shriver defeated  Hana Mandlíková /  Wendy Turnbull 6–4, 3–6, 6–3
 It was Navratilova's 42nd career Grand Slam title and her 10th US Open title. It was Shriver's 14th career Grand Slam title and her 3rd US Open title.

Mixed doubles

 Raffaella Reggi /  Sergio Casal defeated  Martina Navratilova /  Peter Fleming 6–4, 6–4
 It was Reggi's only career Grand Slam title. It was Casal's 1st career Grand Slam title and his 1st US Open title.

Juniors

Boys' singles
 Javier Sánchez defeated  Franco Davín 6–2, 6–2

Girls' singles
 Elly Hakami defeated  Shaun Stafford 6–2, 6–1

Boys' doubles
 Tomás Carbonell /  Javier Sánchez defeated  Jeff Tarango /  David Wheaton 6–4, 1–6, 6–1

Girls' doubles
 Jana Novotná /  Radka Zrubáková defeated  Elena Brioukhovets /  Leila Meskhi 6–4, 6–2

External links
 Official US Open website

 
 

 
US Open
US Open (tennis) by year
US Open
US Open
US Open
US Open